The 2007 NCAA Division I women's basketball tournament began on March 17, 2007 and concluded on April 3 at Quicken Loans Arena in Cleveland, Ohio. The Final Four consisted of Tennessee, LSU, Rutgers, and North Carolina, with Tennessee defeating Rutgers 59–46 for their seventh National Title. Tennessee's Candace Parker was named the Most Outstanding Player of the tournament.

Notable events
The Dallas Regional largely followed the seeding, with the top two seeds meeting in the regional final, and the top seed, North Carolina, winning 84–72 to move on to the Final Four, the second consecutive trip to the Final Four for the Tarheels. In the Dayton Regional, seventh-seeded Mississippi upset second-seeded Maryland, and followed that with an upset of third-seeded Oklahoma, but in the regional final faced top-seeded Tennessee, who went on to beat Mississippi by 36 points, and move on to the Final Four.

In the Fresno Regional, the second-seeded Stanford Cardinal fell to Florida State, who then lost to third-seeded LSU. The wins by Florida State over ODU and Stanford were vacated by the NCAA. In the regional final, LSU easily beat Connecticut, 73–50. This is, as of 2021, the last Final Four to not feature Connecticut. In the Greensboro Regional, neither of the top two seeds made it to the regional final. The top seed, Duke, lost a one-point game to Rutgers, while the second seed, Vanderbilt, was ousted in the second round by Bowling Green. Fourth-seeded Rutgers beat the third seed, Arizona State, by 19 points in the regional final.

The semifinal game between Tennessee and North Carolina was expected to be a high-scoring game, but it turned out to be more disorder than scoring, In a game the New York Times would describe as an "artless grind", the Tarheels held a 48–36 lead with just over eight minutes to play. They would not score another basket. The Lady Vols, who ended up hitting only 27% of the field goal attempts, went on a 20–2 run, and ended up with the win, 56–50.

In the other semifinal, Rutgers faced LSU. Rutgers's appearance in a Final Four game seemed improbable earlier in the season, when the Scarlet Knights lost four of their first six games, and played so poorly that their coach C. Vivian Stringer revoked their access to their locker room. However, their play, particularly their defense, improved, and they were now a game away from a possible appearance in a national championship game, if they could defeat LSU, who had Sylvia Fowles as a dominant center. Fowles, who would go on to be the second overall WNBA draft pick the following year, had just completed a double-double against Connecticut, scoring 23 points, snaring 15 rebounds and blocking 6 shots. Rutgers held her to five points while missing eight of her ten field goal attempts. Rutgers pulled out to a 37–19 lead at halftime, and went on to win, holding LSU to 35 points, an NCAA record low in a Final Four game.

In the championship game, Tennessee was too much for Rutgers. The Lady Vols had an eleven-point lead at halftime, which Rutgers cut to seven, but that was as close as they would get. Candace Parker scored 17 points, but Pat Summitt noted the contribution of their 5-foot 2-inch point guard Shannon Bobbitt, who hit two key three-pointers en route to scoring 13 points of her own. Tennessee won 59–46, bringing the seventh national championship to the school, and increasing the win total of Summitt to 947, which is 33 more than Bob Knight, the most victorious coach on the men's side.

Subregionals

Once again, the system was the same as the Division I men's basketball tournament, with the exception that only 64 teams go and there is no play-in game.  Automatic bids are secured by 31 conference champions and 33 at-large bids.

The subregionals, which once again used the "pod system", keeping most teams at or close to the home cities, were held from March 17 to 20 at these locations:
March 17 and 19:
Frank Erwin Center, Austin, Texas (Host: University of Texas at Austin)
Williams Arena, Minneapolis (Host: University of Minnesota, Twin Cities)
Maples Pavilion, Stanford, California (Host: Stanford University)
Galen Center, Los Angeles (Host: University of Southern California)

March 18 and 20:
Breslin Student Events Center, East Lansing, Michigan (Host: Michigan State University)
XL Center, Hartford, Connecticut (Host: University of Connecticut)
Petersen Events Center, Pittsburgh, Pennsylvania (Host: University of Pittsburgh)
RBC Center, Raleigh, North Carolina (Host: North Carolina State University)

Regionals

The regionals were held from March 24 to 27 in the following regions.  The regionals, as they were in the previous two tournaments, were named after the city they were played in.

March 24 and 26:
Fresno Regional, Save Mart Center, Fresno, California (Host: Fresno State University)
Greensboro Regional, Greensboro Coliseum, Greensboro, North Carolina (Host: Atlantic Coast Conference)

March 25 and 27:
Dallas Regional, Reunion Arena, Dallas, Texas (Hosts: Conference USA and Southern Methodist University)
Dayton Regional, University of Dayton Arena, Dayton, Ohio (Host: University of Dayton)

The regional winners advanced to the Final Four, held on April 1 and 3, 2007 at Quicken Loans Arena, in Cleveland, Ohio, hosted by both Cleveland State University and the Mid-American Conference.

Tournament records
 Three pointers—Matee Ajavon, Rutgers high four of five three point field goals. The 80% completion ratio is tied for the best in a Final Four game.
 Points—LSU scored 35 points in the semifinal game, the fewest points scored in a Final Four game.
 Three pointers—Nadia Begay, Boise State, hit eight three point field goals in a first-round game against George Washington, tied for the most scored in a first or second-round game.

Qualifying teams - automatic
Sixty-four teams were selected to participate in the 2007 NCAA Tournament. Thirty-one conferences were eligible for an automatic bid to the 2007 NCAA tournament.

Qualifying teams - at-large
Thirty-three additional teams were selected to complete the sixty-four invitations.

Tournament seeds

Bids by conference
Thirty-one conferences earned an automatic bid.  In twenty-one cases, the automatic bid was the only representative from the conference. Thirty-three additional at-large teams were selected from ten of the conferences.

Bids by state

The sixty-four teams came from thirty-one states, plus Washington, D.C. Texas, Tennessee, and North Carolina had the most teams with five bids each. Nineteen states did not have any teams receiving bids.

Brackets
Data source
(*) – Number of asterisks denotes number of overtimes.

Dallas Regional

Dayton Regional

Fresno Regional

Greensboro Regional

Final Four – Quicken Loans Arena, Cleveland, Ohio

Regional Initials: DAL-Dallas; DAY-Dayton; FRE-Fresno; GRE-Greensboro.

Television and radio
As it had every year since 2003, ESPN and ESPN2 televised all 63 games.  The first two rounds were presented on a regional basis.  In some cases, a complete game of interest to a particular region were shown.  However, most of the telecasts were in a "whip-around" format, with the specific game being shown changed on occasion and the endings to all close games or potential major upsets included.
  All games not shown on either ESPN or ESPN2 in a local market area were available to subscribers of ESPN Full Court, a pay-per-view package available on most major cable and satellite providers.  Select games were also simulcast on ESPNU and ESPN360.

All games from the regional semifinals forward were televised nationally on either ESPN or ESPN2, in both standard-definition and high-definition formats.  The Final Four was on ESPN.  In addition, the championship game was presented in the ESPN Full Circle format.

ESPN had three announcers at each site: a play-by-play announcer, a color commentator, and a sideline reporter.  (In contrast, CBS Sports, which covers nearly every game of the men's tournament, did not use sideline reporters until the Final Four.) Mike Patrick, Doris Burke, Holly Rowe and Mark Jones had those respective roles at the Final Four site in Cleveland.  Patrick, Burke and Rowe also covered the Greensboro regional.

Burke, who had been a sideline reporter at previous Final Fours, replaced Ann Meyers, who had that role for the last ten years.  Meyers is now the general manager of the Phoenix Mercury of the WNBA.

Other regional broadcast teams were:
Dallas regional – Jones, Nancy Lieberman, and Rebecca Lobo
Dayton regional – Dave Pasch, Debbie Antonelli, and Heather Cox
Fresno regional – Pam Ward, Jimmy Dykes, and Beth Mowins

Some of the other ESPN commentators during earlier rounds included Linda Cohn, Dave Revsine, Dave Barnett, Fran Fraschilla, and Van Chancellor.

Trey Wingo was the studio host, with analysts Kara Lawson and Stacey Dales.

Mowins and Debbie Antonelli called the Final Four action on Westwood One radio.

Comments
Judy Southard, an athletics administrator at Louisiana State University, is the head of the Division I Women's Basketball Committee, which selected and seeded the teams for this event.  Southard carried on her duties despite an ongoing scandal in which the head women's basketball coach, Pokey Chatman, resigned after it was alleged that she had an inappropriate sexual relationship with one of her former players.  When asked about the scandal on the ESPN program announcing the tournament field and matchups, Southard declined to comment, saying that she wanted the focus to be on the players and teams in the tourney. Assistant coach Bob Starkey was named interim head coach and guided the Tigers to their fourth consecutive Final Four. 
This was the first tournament since the NCAA began sanctioning women's basketball in which Louisiana Tech is not a participant.  This leaves Tennessee as the only program to appear in all 26 events.
Texas was not in the tournament in consecutive seasons for the first time in its history.  (At about the same moment that the selections were announced, Jody Conradt, who won 900 games and a championship during her tenure, resigned as the team's head coach.)
Marist College was the first current MAAC participant to win in the NCAA tournament. The MAAC was previously 0–21 in the tournament under its current membership.  Marist also matched the record for the lowest seed to advance to the Sweet Sixteen as a 13 seed. Texas A&M did so in 1994 and Liberty also accomplished this in 2005.
The Bowling Green State University Falcons became the first team from the Mid American Conference to reach the Sweet Sixteen of the NCAA Division I women's basketball tournament, after they upset the second seed Vanderbilt 59–56 at the Breslin Student Events Center in East Lansing, Michigan in 2007. 
The Final Four logo features a guitar that resembles the Fender Stratocaster, marking the fact that Cleveland serves as the home of the Rock and Roll Hall of Fame. Also, the opening teases on the ESPN telecasts featured an actress playing a disc jockey and mock-up vinyl album covers with players and coaches pictured, to further advance the theme.  At the Final Four, a picture of a guitar was applied onto the playing surface with a wood finish, and ESPN used classic rock and roll and R&B songs to lead out into some of the commercial breaks.
 Rutgers' Cinderella performance in the NCAA tournament was the indirect catalyst of a chain of events that led to CBS Radio firing nationally syndicated radio host Don Imus and to a car accident that nearly killed New Jersey governor Jon Corzine.  After their underdog performance, Imus mentioned the Rutgers women's basketball team in his radio program, where he referred to the team as "nappy-headed hos", which resulted in his radio show being canceled by CBS Radio and MSNBC on April 12, 2007. In an attempt to apologize to the Rutgers' basketball team, Don Imus apologized to the Rutgers team in person at the New Jersey governor's mansion in Princeton, New Jersey.  The meeting was also to be attended by Corzine, but on his way to the meeting, he was involved in an auto accident that left him in critical condition.

Record by conference

Eighteen conferences went 0-1: America East, Atlantic Sun Conference, Big Sky Conference, Big South Conference, Big West Conference, Conference USA, Ivy League, Mid-Continent, MEAC, Missouri Valley Conference, Northeast Conference, Ohio Valley Conference, Patriot League, Southern Conference, Southland, SWAC, West Coast Conference, and WAC

All-Tournament Team

 Candace Parker, Tennessee
 Matee Ajavon, Rutgers
 Nicky Anosike, Tennessee
 Shannon Bobbitt, Tennessee
 Kia Vaughn, Rutgers

Game Officials

 Bob Trammell (semifinal)
 Clarke Stevens (semifinal)
 Eric Brewton (semifinal)
 Dee Kantner (semifinal)
 Denise Brooks-Clauser (semifinal)
 Mary Day (semifinal)
 Lisa Mattingly (final)
 Michael Price  (final)
 Tina Napier (final)

See also
 NCAA Women's Division I Basketball Championship
 2007 NCAA Division I men's basketball tournament
 2007 NAIA Division I men's basketball tournament

Notes

External links

NCAA Division I women's basketball tournament
Tournament
NCAA Division I women's basketball tournament
NCAA Division I women's basketball tournament
Basketball competitions in Cleveland
Basketball competitions in Austin, Texas
Basketball in the Dallas–Fort Worth metroplex
2000s in Cleveland